Nikolaos "Nikos" Michopoulos (born 20 February 1970) is a former Greek professional football player.  During his career he played for PAOK Thesaloniki and Burnley, and a short period to Crystal Palace and Omonia Nicosia.  He played as a goalkeeper and was known for his reactions and shot-stopping ability.

Michopoulos began his career at Apollon Larissa. In 1992 he joined PAOK Thessaloniki, and made over 187 appearances for the Greek team, earning himself 15 international caps for Greece in the process. He was brought to Burnley by Stan Ternent as one of three Greeks to sign for the Clarets along with goalkeeper Luigi Cennamo and centre-forward Dimitrios Papadopoulos.

'Nik the Greek' as he became known established himself solidly as a fan-favourite at Turf Moor and became somewhat of a cult-hero.  He would make almost 100 appearances for the Clarets, his last being in the farcical 7–2 home defeat to Sheffield Wednesday, when he was carried off injured in the first half and replaced by Marlon Beresford.

Michopoulos would return to his native Greece and become goalkeeping coach at his old club, PAOK, a position he still holds.  In pre-season training for the 2005/06 season, Michopoulos was able to meet up with several of his old team-mates when Burnley took on PAOK at a neutral ground.

References

1970 births
Living people
Greek footballers
Association football goalkeepers
English Football League players
Cypriot First Division players
Super League Greece players
Burnley F.C. players
Crystal Palace F.C. players
AC Omonia players
PAOK FC players
Greece international footballers
Greek expatriate footballers
Expatriate footballers in Cyprus
Footballers from Karditsa
20th-century Greek people
21st-century Greek people